Monactis  may refer to:
 Monactis, a plant genus in the family Asteraceae
 Monactis (cnidarian), a sea anemone genus in the family Hormathiidae